Léttir is an Icelandic football club located in Reykjavík. They currently play in the 4. deild karla (fifth tier) league, and participate in the Icelandic Cup. Originally a club based in Laugardalur in Reykjavík before being folded in the beginning of the 21. century.

Léttir was reestablished in 2009 as a “reserve” club for Íþróttafélag Reykjavíkur. Léttir has since played in the lowest tier of the Icelandic football league system.

Stadium 

Léttir play their home matches in the astroturf Léttisbúr (Léttir Cage), which is located at ÍR-völlur ground in south-east Reykjavík. Owned by 2. deild karla (third tier) club Íþróttafélag Reykjavíkur. The stadium's capacity is 800.

The name Léttisbúr or the Léttir cage stems from the tall surrounding fence around the pitch.

Current squad 
As of 12  April 2018.

Achievements 
 3. deild karla:
 Runners Up (1): 1998–99

Coaches 

 Halldór Þ. Halldórsson 2009 - 2010
 Eiður Ottó Bjarnason 2011
 Sigurður H. Höskuldsson 2012
 Ríkarð Óskar Guðnason 2013-2014
 Guðbjartur H. Ólafsson 2015-2016
 Sigmann Þórðarson and Kristján Ari Halldórsson 2017-2019
 Haukur M. Ólafsson and Stefán K. Snorrason 2020
 Kristófer D. Traustason and Steinar Haraldsson 2021-

See also 
 Icelandic football league system
 Football in Iceland

References 

Football clubs in Iceland
Association football clubs established in 1979
Football clubs in Reykjavík
1979 establishments in Iceland